Jessalyn Van Trump (January 16, 1887 – May 2, 1939) was an American silent film actress. 

Van Trump was born in St. Johns, Ohio, but later moved to Hollywood and began acting at age 24. She appeared in over eighty silent films between 1911 and 1928. In the early 1910s, she often appeared opposite Pauline Bush. She died in Hollywood in 1939, at age 52.

Selected filmography

References

External links
 

Actresses from Ohio
American silent film actresses
People from Auglaize County, Ohio
1887 births
1939 deaths
20th-century American actresses